Stoddard Hurd Martin(1811-1865) was an American carpenter and master builder from Milwaukee, Wisconsin who served a single one-year term as a Freesoiler member of the first Wisconsin State Assembly in 1849.

References 

American carpenters
American construction businesspeople
Businesspeople from Milwaukee
Members of the Wisconsin State Assembly
Politicians from Milwaukee
Wisconsin Free Soilers
19th-century American politicians
1811 births
1865 deaths
19th-century American businesspeople